Malarkey means "nonsense" or "rubbish".

It may also refer to:

Persons
Bill Malarkey (1878-1956), American baseball pitcher
Bill Malarkey (politician) (1951-2020), Manx politician
Donald Malarkey (1921–2017), American soldier who fought in World War II
Gary Malarkey (born 1953), former Australian rules footballer
John Malarkey (1872–1949), American baseball pitcher
Michael Malarkey (born 1983), American actor and singer
Alex and Kevin Malarkey, authors of The Boy Who Came Back from Heaven, a 2010 Christian book

Others
Malarkey (board game), published by Parker Brothers
XS Malarkey, an award-winning, not-for-profit comedy club in Fallowfield, Manchester
The Malarkey, the 2009 winning entry in the National Poetry Competition
 Simple J. Malarkey, a caricature of Senator Joseph McCarthy in Walt Kelly's Pogo (comic strip)
 "No Malarkey!", a campaign slogan for Joe Biden's 2020 presidential campaign

See also 
Malarky, a different board game